Nikolay Alekseyevich Soltys (May 19, 1974 – February 13, 2002) was a Ukrainian fugitive charged by the United States District Court for the Eastern District of California in a Federal Bureau of Investigation arrest warrant. The federal charges were for Unlawful Flight to Avoid Prosecution and there were California arrest warrants for six murders of his family members in and around the Sacramento area in August 2001.

Background
Residents from Soltys' former hometown of Shumsk in Western Ukraine described him as a shoemaker with violent and unpredictable behavior.

At the time, Shumsk was a small religious town with a population of 5,000 residents.  The town had four churches: two Orthodox churches from different branches, one Roman Catholic and one Pentecostal. Soltys and his parents belonged to the Pentecostal congregation. His parents joined a wave of Ukrainian religious population seeking refuge to the United States.  Having successfully been granted refugee status in the U.S. by the former Immigration and Naturalization Service (INS), his parents migrated to New York.  Soltys was known to have had violent episodes towards his parents.

ABC News reported that a newspaper from his homeland, the Kyiv daily Fakty (Facts), noted Soltys as being "abrupt" and sometimes violent prior to moving to the United States.  He had arrived in the U.S. to be with his physically ailing father.

The Fakty had apparently confirmed the 27-year-old refugee had a history of violence during an interview of Soltys' parents-in-law.  They also denied that his rejection for enrollment into the Ukrainian military service was due to his mental instability.  Instead, the relatives told the Fakty "What kept him out of the army was due to his flat feet."

Igor Nakonechnyi, the father of Soltys' wife Lyuba, told Fakty that three years prior to the murders Soltys had attacked Lyuba with an ax that Soltys had stored in a closet "for self-defense". Lyuba telephoned her parents seeking help, frantically asking them to come help her "so he doesn't kill me", Nakonechnyi told Fakty. "We begged our daughter not to marry him," Nakonechnyi said. "She always listened and was respectful, but then for the first time in her life she went against her parents, firmly saying, 'We love one another and I am going to live with him.'" 

The brother of Soltys' murdered wife, Petro Nakonechnyi, said that even though he saw Soltys as a friend, he did not want the couple to get married because he saw Soltys as having "an unbalanced temper". After the couple married, Soltys often threatened to hang himself, Nakonechnyi said. He also said, "He beat her when she was pregnant, and once pushed her out of a car on low speed."

During one violent encounter, Nakonechnyi claimed that he and his brother went to the married couple's residence and tried to take their sister back home.  Soltys retaliated and tried to attack the brothers with an ax. After this incident, Soltys left Ukraine, leaving his wife and newborn son and joining his parents in New York in 1998.  After he arrived in New York, he ended up jobless after a car accident injury and was collecting welfare assistance.

Polina Horbonis, Soltys' Ukrainian language teacher at a local school in Shumsk, before he attended vocational training to become a shoemaker, said: "This child had such a character that you never knew what to expect from him in the next moment."

Migration

Shortly after his son was born, Nikolay left Ukraine and traveled to Binghamton, New York, where his parents had settled in the mid-1990s. Family members say Nikolay's parents had moved to the United States under the 1989 Lautenberg Amendment to the Foreign Operations Appropriations Act, a policy that allowed refugees from post-Soviet states to migrate to the U.S., which included Ukraine.

During this time, over 90 percent of the recent Ukrainian refugees in the United States had successfully immigrated as an outcome of the Lautenberg Amendment.  The amendment required the U.S. attorney general to identify Evangelical Christians, Ukrainian Catholics, Ukrainian Autocephalous Orthodox and Jews. These identified populations of refugees were referred to as "likely targets of persecution" in the former Soviet Union. Under this legislation, candidates were permitted admission if they could prove a justifiable fear of persecution. In practice, one's admission could be granted by simply telling U.S. embassy officials that such a fear was in place.

In 1998, the U.S had limited the number of Soviet refugees allowed to enter the country to 50,000.   As of 1995, priority was provided to designated groups of former Soviet citizens that the U.S. Congress had recognized as probable targets for persecution.  The groups included Ukrainian Catholics, Evangelical Christians, Jews and followers of the Ukrainian Autocephalous Orthodox Church.

A requirement called for the applicant to be of "good moral character", said INS spokeswoman Kimberly Weissman, in Washington, D.C.  "We wouldn't have approved an applicant who openly or admittedly has a criminal record," Weissman said.

Soltys was able to join his parents in 1998, using their status as persecuted Evangelical Christians, which gained his parents entry into the United States.

20-year-old Ananiy Vasyura, who defined himself as Soltys' best friend in Binghamton, New York, recalls Soltys as a "real Christian guy" who frequently recited Bible verses. He noted that Soltys didn't drink or do drugs and liked working on cars. While in New York, Soltys had little money and lost his car after an accident. The crash also left him with back pain.  Vasyura said Soltys often visited a chiropractor after the accident and wasn't working due to his injuries.

After the loss of his father, Soltys and his mother decided to join relatives in California and moved to Sacramento.  "He just thought it would be better there than here," Vasyura said. "Financially and weather-wise".

Murders

After 9 a.m. on Monday, August 20, 2001, the killings started at three locations; two in the suburbs of Sacramento, with the third alleged to have taken place in a field in Placer County, adjacent to, the north of, Sacramento County.

Pregnant wife

As Lyubov, Soltys' wife of over 3-years, was about to leave the couple's home, a duplex they had moved into two months earlier, to start her first day of work, Soltys began stabbing her. Wounded, Lyubov tried to escape and stumbled to their next-door neighbor's home for help, shouting, "He stabbed me!" The neighbors immediately fled into their garage.   The couple then listened from the garage as Soltys finished his wife's slashing.  According to the couple, Soltys then got into his car and sped away.

The Sacramento County Sheriff's Department said they received a 9-1-1 call around 10 a.m. from a Scallop Court resident in North Highlands. When deputies arrived, another neighbor, Vitaly Maznik, acted as an interpreter for detectives.  Maznik said Soltys' wife was three months pregnant and scheduled to start her new job at 9:30 a.m. as a cashier at the Good Neighbor store on College Oak Drive. 
Responding officers found Lyubov in front of her neighbor's home fatally stabbed, with her throat slashed. "He finished her there," Maznik said. "It's a terrible story."

Before 10 a.m., Soltys left the North Highlands murder scene. Witnesses told detectives he had fled in his 1995 silver Nissan Altima.  He drove to the home of his aging aunt and uncle in Rancho Cordova, also a suburb of Sacramento, approximately fifteen miles southeast from North Highlands.

Aunt, uncle and cousins

Soltys had lived with his aunt and uncle prior to his wife's arrival from Ukraine.  When he first arrived Monday morning he showed no signs of trouble, authorities said.

Before 11 a.m., authorities received a second 9-1-1 call requiring them to dispatch immediately to a residence at the 10000 block of Mills Station Road in Rancho Cordova. A neighbor down the street, who was outside working on his car's brakes, saw the girl's blood covered body in the roadway and dialed 911 to report a hit-and-run. "I thought she was run over by a car, and then I heard a woman say, 'There's another one over here,'" Christopher Smith said.

The Sacramento Bee daily newspaper reported that, according to sources, the three - the elderly couple and Soltys - went up to the second-floor of the duplex. Evidence indicates that the three had chatted politely for a while about family matters. At the closing of the discussion is when, authorities said, Soltys produced a knife and began stabbing and slashing the elderly couple.  The couple were found slain in an upstairs bathroom.

Detectives said Soltys then went downstairs on the hunt for his young cousins, who also lived on Mills Station Road. He attacked 10-year-old Dmitriy, also using a knife.  This is when 9-year-old Tatyana had come to the attack and tried to free her cousin from Soltys' slashings.

Tatyana's aunt Inna Yasinsky said that Dmitriy's mother witnessed part of the attack after hearing screams from her duplex home next door.  Yasinky said, "She saw her son stabbed and her beloved niece stabbed."  She said that Tatyana was killed while trying to save her cousin, and that two other children managed to escape. Tatyana's twin sister, Galina, and her little sister, Viktoria, were also targets of the killings, investigators said, but escaped by running away from the scene.  She also said, "The other children, when they saw Nikolay so furious, they ran away." Later that same day, the fathers of the two murdered children came out of their homes and started washing their children's blood stains from the outer walls of the duplex and walkways. Neighbors consoled the fathers as they sprayed cleaners and wiped all the blood stains left behind.

Authorities noted that Soltys left the Mills Station murder scene and drove to his mother's house in Citrus Heights, a suburb of Sacramento, where she was babysitting his 3-year-old son Sergey Soltys. Unemployed, collecting welfare, and having successfully completed his eight-hour a day, five days a week English class, Soltys was to have enrolled in the American River College in Foothill Farms, also a Sacramento suburb, that same day. This is what directed detectives to determine the reason for why Soltys' mother was caring for the boy. His enrollment did not occur.

Firefighters arrived on scene first and found a severely stabbed young girl lying in the middle of the street in front of the elderly aunt and uncle's duplex.  The girl was 9-year-old Tatyana Kukharskaya, granddaughter of the aging couple.  She was immediately taken to the University of California at Davis Medical Center, where she was pronounced dead upon arrival.  A spokeswoman for the center announced that the girl had passed away en route to the center.  A 10-year-old grandson of the elderly couple, Dmitry Kukharskiy, was found dead on the walkway adjacent to the front of the duplex.  Witnesses said that the brutally stabbed children ran from their grandparents' home and the boy died in the arms of his mother, who ran out of the other half of the duplex when she heard the children screaming. The children were cousins and second cousins to Soltys. The elderly married couple - 74-year-old Galina Kukharskaya, and 75-year-old Peter Kukharskiy (the variations in the spelling of their last names distinguish gender) - were found dead on the second-floor of their duplex.

Son's death

When Soltys arrived at his mother's home on Monday afternoon, she told detectives on Tuesday that he seemed peaceful but hasty. He instantly walked to the kitchen sink and washed his hands, and the mother said he seemed messy but she saw no obvious bloodstains. After washing his hands, he quickly took his 3-year-old, blonde haired son, Sergey Soltys, and left.

With multiple witnesses connecting Soltys' Nissan Altima to the Midland Heights and Rancho Cordova murder scene getaways, police were able to find the abandoned Altima in the midnight hours of Monday.  Detectives discovered a photo in the abandoned car a little after midnight on Tuesday. Authorities said the photo was found tucked away in the driver's side door storage compartment. Written on the back of the photo, of Sergey Soltys being held on his mother's lap, was a clue of where his son's body could be found. The note was written in Ukrainian, Soltys' mother translated the note for law enforcement, "He is in a box on a garbage pile at the end of Watt Avenue near the tower."

The boy's body was discovered in a blood-filled cardboard box, that was made for a 37-inch television set, by Sacramento County sheriff personnel. Prior to the discovery, sheriff officials had been searching along Watt Avenue, with helicopters and K-9 units, since the early morning hours of Tuesday.  "I thought there was some hope that we'd still find the kid alive," said Sacramento County Sheriff Lou Blanas after the discovery of the toddler's body was released. "It is just very sad that this is the way it turned out."

Soltys' abandoned Nissan Altima was found Monday night near the intersection of Auburn Boulevard and Madison Avenue.  When detectives found the photo, they were not sure the message was authentic or simply a lie to lead the official's investigation in a flawed direction.

In the hours prior to the toddler's discovery, four Russian-speaking Sacramentans, made up of two sheriff deputies and two civilians, were the first persons to attempt to translate the photo's note.  They told investigators that "The boy could be found in a box at the end of Watt avenue."  Based on this translation an extensive search was conducted over hours where Watt Avenue dead ends at Baseline Road, just across the Sacramento County line in Placer County.

Officials came up empty handed in their search and the Sheriff's Department then brought Soltys' mother in for questioning and to look at the note.  She found the word "tower" in the writing, officials said the initial Russian translators missed the word due to differences in their dialects.

With this new information of the tower, Blanas ordered the entire department's day shift to remain on duty and to ready for the expanded search of Watt Avenue.  At approximately 4 p.m., investigators discovered the cardboard box.  It was found in Placer County approximately half-a-mile from the corner of Baseline Road and Crowder Lane, within a couple of miles from where Watt Avenue ended. The box was placed below a telecommunication switching tower atop a pile of garbage in a grove of oak trees.  Authorities announced that the boy's killing appeared to be from knife stabbings and the cutting off of the child's tongue, leading him to bleed profusely from his mouth. They speculated that his life was taken on Monday afternoon, within hours of the previous family murders.

Later an auto mechanic contacted the authorities and told them he had worked on the vehicle that Soltys was driving Monday evening.  He described the vehicle as a mid-1990s emerald green Ford Explorer with the color silver at the bumper line and below. The mechanic said Soltys' son, Sergey, was with the suspect at the time. He said he had worked on the car around 8 p.m. and had removed cargo rails from the top of the vehicle.

Aftermath 
On August 23, he became the 466th fugitive to be placed on the FBI's Ten Most Wanted list.

On August 30, Soltys was arrested in the backyard of a family member's home without incident in Citrus Heights, California. He hanged himself in Sacramento County Jail on February 13, 2002.

References

External links 
 FBI Press Release on Soltys' top Ten Fugitive listing hosted on archive.org
 FBI Press Release on Soltys' top Ten Fugitive arrest hosted on archive.org
 Mayhem.net profile on Mr. Soltys
 
 Rampage: Toddler Found Slain, Wired (August 21, 2001)
 Grief grips Sacramento's Ukrainians, BBC News (August 22, 2001)

American murderers of children
Familicides
1974 births
2002 deaths
2001 murders in the United States
American spree killers
American people who died in prison custody
Suicides by hanging in California
People who committed suicide in prison custody
Prisoners who died in California detention
Ukrainian emigrants to the United States
Ukrainian criminals
Stabbing attacks in the United States
2002 suicides